The Integrity Party of Aotearoa New Zealand (TIPANZ) is an unregistered political party in New Zealand. It is a progressive-centrist party, with an ideology of Hauora (well-being), equality, and integrity. It is led by Helen Cartwright with Troy Mihaka as deputy.

Foundation 
The party was founded by former Sustainable New Zealand Party secretary Helen Cartwright and former Wellington local body candidate Troy Mihaka. Mihaka stood for election to Wellington City Council in 2019 for the centre-right Wellington Party.

2020 general election 
The party intended to run both list and electorate candidates in New Zealand's 2020 election, but did not register so was unable to receive party votes. It ran two electoral candidates: Cartwright in Mana and Mihaka in Rongotai. In July 2020 Mihaka's candidate signs were painted with racist abuse, apparently due to the authorisation statement being written in Te Reo. Cartwright said in September 2020 that "If 100 people vote for me, I will be rapt; if 1000 people vote for me, I will do somersaults."

Neither candidate was successful; Cartwright received 360 votes, coming 7th, and Mihaka received 162, coming 8th.

References

2020 establishments in New Zealand
Centrist parties in New Zealand
Political parties established in 2020